Ildulb mac Causantín, anglicised as Indulf or Indulph, nicknamed An Ionsaighthigh, "the Aggressor" (died 962) was king of Alba from 954 to 962. He was the son of Constantine II; his mother may have been a daughter of Earl Eadulf I of Bernicia, who was an exile in Scotland.

John of Fordun and others supposed that Indulf had been king of Strathclyde in the reign of his predecessor, based on their understanding that the kingdom of Strathclyde had become a part of the kingdom of Alba in the 940s. This, however, is no longer accepted.

The Chronicle of the Kings of Alba says: "In his time oppidum Eden", usually identified as Edinburgh, "was evacuated, and abandoned to the Scots until the present day." This has been read as indicating that Lothian, or some large part of it, fell to Indulf at this time. However, the conquest of Lothian is likely to have been a process rather than a single event, and the frontier between the lands of the kings of Alba and Bernicia may have lain south and east of Edinburgh many years before Indulf's reign.

Indulf's death is reported by the Chronicon Scotorum in 962, the Chronicle of the Kings of Alba adding that he was killed fighting Vikings near Cullen, at the Battle of Bauds. The Prophecy of Berchán, however, claims that he died "in the house of the same holy apostle, where his father [died]", that is at the céli dé monastery of St Andrews. He was buried on Iona.

Indulf was succeeded by Dub (Dub mac Maíl Coluim), son of his predecessor. His sons Cuilén and Amlaíb were later kings. Eochaid, a third son, was killed with Cuilén by the men of Strathclyde in 971.

Notes

References
 Anderson, Alan Orr, Early Sources of Scottish History AD 500–1286, volume 1. Reprinted with corrections. Paul Watkins, Stamford, 1990. 
 Duncan, A.A.M., The Kingship of the Scots 842–1292: Succession and Independence. Edinburgh University Press, Edinburgh, 2002. 
 Smyth, Alfred P. Warlords and Holy Men: Scotland AD 80-1000. Reprinted, Edinburgh: Edinburgh UP, 1998. 
 Walker, Ian W., Lords of Alba: The Making of Scotland. Sutton, Stroud, 2006.

External links
 CELT: Corpus of Electronic Texts at University College Cork includes the Annals of Ulster, Tigernach, the Four Masters and Innisfallen, the Chronicon Scotorum, the Lebor Bretnach (which includes the Duan Albanach), Genealogies, and various Saints' Lives. Most are translated into English, or translations are in progress.
 (CKA) The Chronicle of the Kings of Alba 
Indulf at the official website of the British monarchy

  

962 deaths
Monarchs killed in action
Scottish pre-union military personnel killed in action
House of Alpin
Burials in Iona
Year of birth unknown
10th-century Scottish monarchs
Gaels